East Garforth railway station serves Garforth in West Yorkshire, England. The station was opened by West Yorkshire Metro on 1 May 1987, to serve the new housing developments in the area.

The station is an unstaffed halt, and has wooden platforms with shelters on each one.

Facilities

The station is fully accessible for wheelchair users, with ramps from the road to both platforms.  Ticket machines are available for passengers to buy or collect pre-paid tickets prior to travel.  Train running information is provided by a long line P.A system and digital display screens on each platform.

Services

The same frequency remains in place during the evening; on Sundays there are also two trains per hour each way - to Leeds westbound and alternately to York and Selby eastbound.

References

External links

Railway stations in Leeds
DfT Category F1 stations
Railway stations opened by British Rail
Railway stations in Great Britain opened in 1987
Northern franchise railway stations
Former Leeds and Selby Railway stations
Garforth